Events of National Historic Significance  (also called National Historic Events) are events that have been designated by Canada's Minister of Environment and Climate Change, on the advice of the national Historic Sites and Monuments Board, as being defining actions, episodes, movements or experiences in Canadian history.  To be designated, an event must have occurred at least 40 years previous; events that continue into the more recent past are evaluated on the basis of what occurred at least 40 years ago.  As of November 2022, there were 496 National Historic Events.

There are related federal designations for National Historic Sites and National Historic Persons. Events, Sites, and Persons are each typically marked by a federal plaque, but the markers do not indicate which designation a subject has been given. The Welland Canal is an Event, while the Rideau Canal is a Site. The cairn and plaque to John Macdonell does not refer to a National Historic Person, but is erected because his home, Glengarry House, is a National Historic Site. Similarly, the plaque to John Guy officially marks not a Person, but an Event—the Landing of John Guy.

Events have been designated in all 10 provinces and three territories, as well as foreign countries: Belgium, China, France, Italy, Netherlands, South Korea, United Kingdom, United States.

List 
, there were 498 National Historic Events. The "Location" column identifies the place where an event happened or, in the case of widespread or non-specific locations, marks the place where a federal plaque to the event is located or is likely to be located, if known.

See also
 
National Historic Sites
National Historic Persons
Heritage Minutes
List of years in Canada

References